She devil or variant may refer to:

Film
 The She-Devil, a 1918 American silent film
 She Devil (1934 film) or Drums O' Voodoo, based on the play Louisiana
 Tarzan and the She-Devil, a 1953 American film
 She Devil (1957 film), an American sci-fi horror
 She-Devil (1989 film), an American dark comedy

Other uses
 The Life and Loves of a She-Devil (TV series), a British series based on the book of the same name
 She Devil (mountain), a mountain in Idaho, United States
 She Devils, an Argentine punk group
 Penn Jersey She Devils, a roller-derby team
 Trois Filles de leur mère, a 1926 erotic novel by Pierre Louÿs, sometimes translated into English as The She-Devils

See also
 Shanna the She-Devil, a comic superhero
 She Devils in Chains or Ebony, Ivory & Jade, a 1976 Philippine film
 She-Devils on Wheels, a 1968 American film
 She Demons, a 1958 film
 Devil Lady, a 1997 manga series
 Devil Woman (disambiguation)